Donald Erb (January 17, 1927 – August 12, 2008) was an American composer best known for large orchestral works such as Concerto for Brass and Orchestra and Ritual Observances.

Early years
Erb was born in Youngstown, Ohio, graduated from Lakewood High School, a Cleveland suburb, and gained early recognition as a trumpet player for a local dance band. Following a stint in the Navy during World War II, he continued his career as a jazz trumpeter and enrolled at Kent State University, where he earned a Bachelor of Science degree in music in 1950. Three years later, he earned a Master of Music degree from the Cleveland Institute of Music. In 1964, Erb earned a Doctorate in Music from Indiana University Bloomington, where he studied with Bernhard Heiden.

Honors and awards
In the course of his career, Erb earned considerable recognition. He received the 1992 Rome Prize and was composer-in-residence with the St. Louis Symphony Orchestra. He was Distinguished Professor of Composition, Emeritus, at the Cleveland Institute of Music in Cleveland, Ohio. He has received grants and fellowships from the Rockefeller, Guggenheim, Ford, Fromm, and Koussevitzky foundations.

For a list of Erb's notable students, 

He died at his home in Cleveland Heights, Ohio, on August 12, 2008, at the age of 81.

Selected works 

 1966 Concerto for Solo Percussionist
 1964 Symphony of Overtures
 1965 Phantasma for four musicians
 1966 Diversion For Two (other than sex) for trumpet and percussion
 1966 String Trio for violin, electric guitar and violoncello
 1967 Reconnaissance for instruments and electronic sounds
 1968 In No Strange Land for instruments and electronic sounds
 1969 The Seventh Trumpet for orchestra
 1983 "Prismatic Variations" for orchestra
 1986 Concerto for Brass and Orchestra
 1994 Changes 
 1994 Remembrances 
 1994 Sonata for Solo Violin
 1995 Sunlit Peaks and Dark Valleys
 1995 Sonata for Solo Harp
      "Autumn Music for Orchestra"
      "Christmas Music for Orchestra"
      "Harold's Trip to the Sky" for Viola, piano and percussion
      "Klangfarbenfunk I & II" for jazz group and orchestra
      "Percussion Concerto" for percussion and orchestra
      "The Hawk" for jazz group
      "The Treasures of the Snow" for electronics and orchestra
      "Trombone Concerto"
      "2 Milosci do Warszawy" for piano, clarinet, cello, trombone and electronic sounds
String Quartet N. 1
String Quartet N. 2
String Quartet N. 3
"Music for Mother Bear" for flute alone
      "Evensong" for orchestra

References

External links
Donald Erb's page at Theodore Presser Company
Obituary from New York Times, August 15, 2008
Donald Erb bio  as listed by the Cleveland Composers Guild
Interview with Donald Erb, February 28, 1985

1927 births
2008 deaths
Cleveland Institute of Music alumni
Kent State University alumni
Indiana University Bloomington alumni
20th-century classical composers
21st-century classical composers
American male classical composers
American classical composers
Nonesuch Records artists
Musicians from Youngstown, Ohio
Cleveland Institute of Music faculty
United States Navy personnel of World War II
Pupils of Bernhard Heiden
21st-century American composers
20th-century American composers
Classical musicians from Ohio
20th-century American male musicians
21st-century American male musicians